The Chanting Dread Inna Fine Style is a 1983 compilation of singles tracks released by Big Youth on his Negusa Nagast label dating back as far as 1973 ("Street In Africa"). It followed the similarly-sourced Some Great Big Youth collection. Both albums were released by Heartbeat Records.

Track listing
All tracks composed by Manley Buchanan; except where indicated
 "My Time"
 "Skyjuice"
 "African Daughter"
 "My Buddy"
 "All Nations Bow" (Winston Riley)
 "Salvation Light"
 "Dread Inna Babylon"
 "Mama Look"
 "Streets in Africa"
 "Jah Jah Shall Guide"
 "Jah Jah Love Them"
 "Jah Jah Golden Jubilee"
 "Golden Dub"
 "Who Laughed Last"

Personnel
 Big Youth - vocals
 Earl "Chinna" Smith - guitar
 Lynford "Hux" Brown - guitar
 Tony Chin - rhythm guitar
 Radcliffe "Duggie" Bryan - guitar 
 Earl "Wire" Lindo 
 Augustus Pablo - keyboards
 Tyrone Downie - keyboards
 U. Malcolm - piano, organ
 J.J. Jackson, George Fullwood - bass
 Carlton "Santa" Davis -  drums
 S. Martin, Carlton Barrett - drums 
 Gregory Isaacs - background vocals
 Dennis Brown - background vocals
 The Heptones - background vocals

References

Big Youth albums
1982 compilation albums